Bromo is a prefix referring to the element Bromine.

Bromo may also refer to:

 Bromo-Seltzer, an antacid
 Mount Bromo, an Indonesian volcano
 Bromo-DragonFLY, a psychedelic hallucinogen

Other uses 

 BROMO, an acronym to refer to instances when one's friends (“bros”) protect them from missing out